The Raw Air 2023 is the sixth edition of Raw Air for men and the 4th edition for women, a ten-day tournament in ski jumping and ski flying held across Norway between 10 and 19 March 2023. It is part of the 2022/23 World Cup season, except for women's ski flying, which is the FIS Cup.

Competition format 
The competition is held on three different hills: Oslo, Lillehammer and Vikersund. It lasts for ten consecutive days with a total of 18 rounds from individual events and qualifications (prologues) for men; and for six consecutive days plus the final event after a three-day break with total of 14 rounds from individual events and qualifications (prologues) for women.

Venues

Results

Men

Women

References 

2023
2023 in ski jumping
2023 in Norwegian sport
March 2023 sports events in Europe